Dessie is a masculine given name, often a short form of Desmond. Notable people with the name include:

Men
 Desmond Dessie Baker (born 1977), Irish footballer
 Desmond Dessie Cullinane (1919–1990), Irish Gaelic footballer
 Dessie Dolan (born 1979), Irish former Gaelic footballer
 Dessie Donnelly (born 1959), Irish former hurler
 Desmond Dessie Ellis (born 1953), Irish politician
 Dessie Farrell, Irish Gaelic football coach and former player
 Dessie Finnegan, 21st century Gaelic footballer
 Desmond Dessie Glynn (1928–2017), Irish footballer
 Desmond Dessie Gorman (born 1964), Irish former footballer
 Desmond Dessie Grew (1953–1990), member of the Provisional Irish Republican Army
 Dessie Hughes (c. 1943–2014), Irish racehorse trainer and jockey
 Dessie Hutchinson (born 1996), Irish hurler and former professional association footballer
 Dessie O'Hare (born 1956), Irish republican paramilitary
 Desmond O'Malley (1939–2021), Irish politician and cabinet minister
 Dessie Larkin (c. 1970–2019), Irish politician
 Dessie Sheehan (born 1949), Irish former snooker player
 Desmond Dessie Sloyan (born 1976), Irish former Gaelic footballer

Women
 Dessie Smith Prescott (1906–2002), Florida’s first professional woman guide and first female licensed pilot

Irish masculine given names
Hypocorisms
Lists of people by nickname